Bagtyýarlyk şäherçesi, formerly known as Ücajy ( Uch-Adzhi), is a town in Baýramaly District, Mary Province, Turkmenistan. The town was known as Üçajy ( Үчаҗы) until 20 September 2012, when by Parliamentary Resolution No. 331-IV it was renamed Bagtyýarlyk.

Etymology
The original name of the settlement is a compound of two words, üç and ajy, which mean "three" and "bitter", respectively. Atanyyazow explains that the first three water wells drilled here, when the rail line was being extended to Çärjew, yielded bitter water, hence the name, which was later applied to the town and a nearby state farm. The word bagtyýarlyk simply means "happiness".

Transportation
The M37 highway passes through the town. It is also served by a station on the Trans-Caspian Railway.

References

Populated places in Mary Region